Jean Saenen (born 28 May 1904) was a Belgian wrestler. He competed in the men's Greco-Roman middleweight at the 1928 Summer Olympics.

References

External links
 

1904 births
Year of death missing
Belgian male sport wrestlers
Olympic wrestlers of Belgium
Wrestlers at the 1928 Summer Olympics
20th-century Belgian people